Coroa may be:

another name for the Acroá language
a possible extinct dialect of the Bororo language